Railway Stadium is a cricket ground in Vasco da Gama, Goa, India.  The only recorded match held on the ground was a first-class match between Goa played Kerala in the 1986/87 Ranji Trophy, which Kerala won by 6 wickets.

References

External links
Railway Stadium at ESPNcricinfo
Railway Stadium at CricketArchive

Cricket grounds in Goa
Buildings and structures in Vasco da Gama, Goa
1985 establishments in Goa, Daman and Diu
Sports venues completed in 1985
20th-century architecture in India